The 4th Ward is one of the 50 aldermanic wards with representation in the City Council of Chicago, Illinois. It is broken into 52 election precincts. Lake Michigan is the ward's eastern boundary for much of its area. Its northwesternmost point, as of 2002, was located at the intersection of East 26th Street and South Prairie Avenue and its southeasternmost point at the intersection of East 55th Street and Lake Park Avenue.

David K. Fremon wrote in 1988 that "No other ward has wealth and poverty in such proximity."

History
The 4th ward was one six created upon Chicago's incorporation as a city in 1837. At the time its boundaries were the city limits at North Avenue and Wood Street to its respective north and west, Randolph Street to its south, and the Chicago River to its east. In 1847 it was moved to the Loop and Near South Side, being bounded by the Chicago River to its north and west, 22nd street (modern Cermak) to its south, and Wells Street to its east. In 1857 the southern boundary was extended to 31st street and in 1863 the ward was significantly moved eastward, bounded by 16th street, Lake Michigan, 31st street, and Clark Street. In 1869 its southern boundary was retracted to 26th street.

In 1876 it was moved southward, between 26th street and Egan Street (modern-day Pershing) and Lake Michigan and Clark Street. In 1887 it was moved south yet again, to the area bounded by the Lake, 33rd and 39th streets, and Stewart Avenue. In 1901 it was extended west to once again touch the River, which it would do until 1923. In 1923, coincident with the City being divided into its modern 50 wards, it covered Kenwood and northern Washington Park.

List of Aldermen

1837 – 1923
Before 1923, Wards were represented by two aldermen

1923 – present

See also
50th Ward in Chicago

References

Neighborhoods in Chicago
City of Chicago Wards